The 1966 Boston Patriots season was the franchise's 7th season in the American Football League. The Patriots ended the season with a record of eight wins and four losses and two ties, and finished second in the AFL's Eastern Division. This would be the last winning season the Patriots posted as an AFL team; they would not have another such season until 1976, by which time the team was in the NFL as the New England Patriots.

Staff

Game-by-game results

Standings

Roster

All of the following players appeared in at least one game for the 1966 Boston Patriots.

Notes and references
.  For game-by-game results
.  For team roster
. For season summary

Boston Patriots
New England Patriots seasons
Boston Patriots
1960s in Boston